Pukalani is a census-designated place (CDP) in Maui County, Hawaii, United States. The population was 8,299 at the 2020 census. The general volcano-slope region, including nearby Makawao and Kula, is referred to as upcountry by locals, and is one of the four major population centers on Maui, the other three being Kahului, Lahaina and Kīhei, all of which are at sea level.

Geography
Pukalani is located at  (20.840039, -156.343808).

Pukalani (pronounced Poo-cah-lah-nee) in Hawaiian means "window of heaven".  It has also been said it was originally called Pu'ukalani meaning hill of heaven. It is commonly misinterpreted to mean "hole in the sky". This misinterpretation comes from the plantation and immigration movement to Hawa'i'i, uniting multiple cultures and creating a new language called "Pidgin" or "Pidgin English" referring to Puka as hole. Clouds form above and below the community on Haleakalā, leaving Pukalani sunny most of the time. With cool and often brisk temperatures. Pukalani is one of the few places besides Haleakala and Kula that one can view the northern, western, and eastern sides of Maui.

Demographics

As of the census of 2000, there were 7,379 people, 2,439 households, and 1,904 families residing in the CDP. The racial makeup of the CDP was 33.97% White, 0.41% African American, 0.23% Native American, 28.04% Asian, 7.38% Pacific Islander, 1.00% from other races, and 28.97% from two or more races. Hispanic or Latino of any race were 9.23% of the population.

There were 2,439 households, out of which 40.6% had children under the age of 18 living with them, 59.4% were married couples living together, 12.8% had a female householder with no husband present, and 21.9% were non-families. 14.5% of all households were made up of individuals, and 3.9% had someone living alone who was 65 years of age or older.  The average household size was 3.03 and the average family size was 3.31.

In the CDP the population was spread out, with 28.0% under the age of 18, 6.9% from 18 to 24, 29.7% from 25 to 44, 25.5% from 45 to 64, and 9.9% who were 65 years of age or older.  The median age was 37 years. For every 100 females, there were 98.1 males.  For every 100 females age 18 and over, there were 96.0 males.

The median income for a household in the CDP was $62,778, and the median income for a family was $65,087. Males had a median income of $39,128 versus $29,107 for females. The per capita income for the CDP was $23,662.  About 4.7% of families and 6.4% of the population were below the poverty line, including 8.4% of those under age 18 and 6.0% of those age 65 or over.

Education
Pukalani has a relatively new public high school, King Kekaulike High School which opened its doors in 1995 to its first freshman class. Pukalani is also home to Kamehameha Schools Maui and the Carden Academy, both private schools.

References

External links

Census-designated places in Maui County, Hawaii
Populated places on Maui